"Shanghai Breezes" is the title of a popular song by the American singer-songwriter John Denver. Released as a single from his 1982 album Seasons of the Heart, "Shanghai Breezes" would become Denver's fifteenth and final Top 40 hit on the Billboard Hot 100 chart, peaking at No. 31 during the spring of 1982. It also became the singer's ninth No. 1 song on the adult contemporary chart.

Record World said that "Denver's light vocals and the playful keyboard accompaniment bespeak a refreshing childlike innocence."

Chart performance

See also
List of number-one adult contemporary singles of 1982 (U.S.)

References

Whitburn, Joel (1996). The Billboard Book of Top 40 Hits, 6th Edition (Billboard Publications)

1982 singles
John Denver songs
Songs written by John Denver
RCA Records singles
1982 songs